Barry Award is the name of several different awards:
 Melbourne International Comedy Festival Award, an Australian award for comedy formerly known as the Barry Award
 Barry Award (crime novel prize), an American award